The canton of Le Chambon-Feugerolles is a French former administrative division located in the department of Loire and the Rhone-Alpes region. It was disbanded following the French canton reorganisation which came into effect in March 2015. It consisted of 2 communes, which joined the new canton of Saint-Étienne-2 in 2015. It had 20,278 inhabitants (2012).

The canton comprised the following communes:
Le Chambon-Feugerolles
La Ricamarie

See also
Cantons of the Loire department

References

Chambon-Feugerolles
2015 disestablishments in France
States and territories disestablished in 2015